São João da Pesqueira is a municipality and municipal seat in the Portuguese district of Viseu. The population of the municipality in 2011 was approximately 7,874 inhabitants, in an area that extends . The present mayor is Manuel Cordeiro, elected by a citizens' movement. The municipal holiday is June 24.

History
São João da Pesqueira is the oldest recognized municipality in the country, created in 1055, thus taking precedence over such major cities as Coimbra, Guimarães or Lamego.

Geography

The municipality includes an attractive countryside with viewpoints over the Douro valley and the Valeira dam from the chapel of São Salvador do Mundo (Ermo).

Administratively, the municipality is divided into 11 civil parishes:
 Castanheiro do Sul
 Ervedosa do Douro
 Nagoselo do Douro
 Paredes da Beira
 Riodades
 São João da Pesqueira e Várzea de Trevões
 Soutelo do Douro
 Trevões e Espinhosa
 Vale de Figueira
 Valongo dos Azeites
 Vilarouco e Pereiros

Economy
Situated in the heart of the Douro wine region, São João da Pesqueira is well endowed with vineyards that support the production of vintage and port wines.

Tourist attractions include a wine museum in Pesqueira and a network of waymarked hiking trails, including a section of the GR 14 Porto to Strasbourg Rota dos Vinhos da Europa (European Wine Route trail).

References

External links

Towns in Portugal
Populated places in Viseu District
Municipalities of Viseu District